The Monster is a Gerstlauer steel roller coaster at Adventureland in Altoona, Iowa. It opened to the public on June 4, 2016 as the first Infinity Coaster in the United States.

History
The Monster was announced on Adventureland's Facebook page on July 8, 2015. It replaced the River Rapids Log Ride, a log flume which was removed due to maintenance issues. The park was looking for a suitable replacement for the ride.

On June 4, 2016, the Monster opened to guests.

Ride experience
The ride, located in the center of the park, can be distinguished by its bright green track. The Monster features a vertical  lift hill and a first drop at a 101 degree angle. The next element is a large overbanked turn, providing a significant amount of hangtime, after which the riders are redirected into a hill and then navigate the twisted drop that goes directly into a Finnish loop, before going into a dive loop that will take riders into an air time hill then an Immelmann loop. The car then goes into its only set of trim brakes, an overbanked turn and its final inversion, a corkscrew.

Characteristics 
The ride features  of track, five inversions and takes roughly two minutes to complete. The Monster features a nighttime LED display made up of 46 ground lights and 137 track-mounted fixtures provided by KCL Engineering. The Monster lighting system originator and designer, Mike Lambert, was recognized with (2) Illuminating Engineering Society (IES) Illumination Awards for Innovation in Design.

References

External links
 

Roller coasters in Iowa
Roller coasters manufactured by Gerstlauer
Roller coasters introduced in 2016
Buildings and structures in Polk County, Iowa